Uroballus is a spider genus of the jumping spider family, Salticidae. It includes seven accepted species.

Uroballus is similar to the related genus Stertinius. Other related genera are Ligurra, Phyaces and Simaetha.

Description
Uroballus are about 3 mm long in both sexes. The cephalothorax is very broad, almost square. The abdomen is oval, the first pair of legs thick and short with swollen femora. The other legs are weak.

The spinnerets are very long and thin. Among spiders, only Hersiliidae possess longer spinnerets.  The function of such long spinnerets remains unknown.
Adult spiders of some species may mimic lichen moths caterpillars.

Name
The genus name is a combination of Ancient Greek οὐρᾱ́ (ourā́) "tail" and the salticid genus Ballus, referring to the long spinnerets.

Species
, the World Spider Catalog accepted seven species:
 Uroballus carlei Logunov & Obenauer, 2019 — Hong Kong
 Uroballus henicurus Simon, 1902 — Sri Lanka
 Uroballus kinabalu Logunov, 2018 — Borneo
 Uroballus koponeni Logunov, 2014 — Borneo
 Uroballus nazirwanii (Prajapati, Malamel & Sebastian, 2020) — India
 Uroballus octovittatus Simon, 1902 — Sri Lanka
 Uroballus peckhami Zabka, 1985 — Vietnam

References

Bibliography
 Murphy, Frances & Murphy, John (2000): An Introduction to the Spiders of South East Asia. Malaysian Nature Society, Kuala Lumpur.

Salticidae
Salticidae genera
Spiders of Asia